Eriophyllum confertiflorum, commonly called golden yarrow or yellow yarrow, is a North American species of plant in the family Asteraceae, native to California and Baja California. It has wooly leaves when young, and yellow flower heads. "Eriophyllum" means "wooly leaved."

Eriophyllum confertiflorum gets its common name from the similar appearance of its inflorescence to the true yarrow, which has white flowers.

Habitat and distribution
Eriophyllum confertiflorum is a highly variable plant which is generally a small shrub. It grows primarily in the Sierra Nevada and Coastal Ranges in California and Baja California. It can be found in a number of plant communities and habitats. In the Santa Monica Mountains of California, it is common in open places that are away from the coast.

Eriophyllum confertiflorum grows in large clumps or stands of many erect stems often exceeding 50 cm (20 inches) in height. Botanist Nancy Dale describes the growth pattern as "tidy". Leaves are alternate. Leaves and stems are whitish when young, because of being covered in wooly white hairs, then become greenish to gray-green. Leaves have 3-5 deep lobes. Yellow flowers are crowded in the head, which is up to 3/8 inch (0.94 cm) across, flat-topped, with both disc flowers and ray flowers. "Confertiflorum" means densely flowered. It blooms from January to July. The fruit is an achene with a very short pappus. The top of each stem forms an inflorescence of up to 30} flower heads, each bright golden yellow head with a large center of disc florets and usually a fringe of rounded to oval ray florets.

Varieties
Eriophyllum confertiflorum var. confertiflorum - most of species range
Eriophyllum confertiflorum var. tanacetiflorum (Greene) Jeps. - Sierra Nevada foothills + San Gabriel Mountains
Eriophyllum confertiflorum var. trifidum (Nutt.) A.Gray - California coast between Santa Barbara + Monterey

References

External links

Jepson Manual Treatment: Eriophyllum confertiflorum
United States Department of Agriculture Plants Profile
Eriophyllum confertiflorum - Calphotos Photo gallery, University of California

confertiflorum
Flora of California
Flora of Baja California
Flora of the Sierra Nevada (United States)
Natural history of the California chaparral and woodlands
Natural history of the Channel Islands of California
Natural history of the California Coast Ranges
Natural history of the Peninsular Ranges
Natural history of the Santa Monica Mountains
Natural history of the Transverse Ranges
Plants described in 1836
Taxa named by Asa Gray
Flora without expected TNC conservation status